Cotton Hill Township is located in Sangamon County, Illinois. As of the 2010 census, its population was 902 and it contained 389 housing units.  The township is the home of Hunter Lake, a proposed  reservoir.

Geography

Demographics

References

External links
City-data.com
Illinois State Archives

Townships in Sangamon County, Illinois
Springfield metropolitan area, Illinois
Townships in Illinois